Sascha Heyer (born 21 July 1972 in Zürich) is a beach volleyball player from Switzerland, who won the silver medal in the men's beach team competition at the 2005 Beach Volleyball World Championships in Berlin, Germany, with partner Paul Laciga.  As of 2011, his current partner is Sébastien Chevallier. The pair participated in the 2012 Summer Olympics tournament where they lost in the round of 16.

Playing partners
 Paul Laciga
 Patrick Heuscher
 Sébastien Chevallier
 Martin Tschudi
 Nick Heyer

References

1972 births
Living people
Swiss beach volleyball players
Men's beach volleyball players
Beach volleyball players at the 2008 Summer Olympics
Beach volleyball players at the 2012 Summer Olympics
Olympic beach volleyball players of Switzerland
Sportspeople from Zürich